Bernt Østerkløft (6 April 1906 – 20 July 1996) was a Norwegian Nordic combined skier who competed in the 1930s. He finished sixth in the Nordic combined event at the 1936 Winter Olympics in Garmisch-Partenkirchen.

He was born in Sørfold in 1906 and died in Fauske in 1996.

External links

Family website

Nordic combined skiers at the 1936 Winter Olympics
Norwegian male Nordic combined skiers
People from Fauske
1906 births
1996 deaths
Sportspeople from Nordland
20th-century Norwegian people